António Dias Teixeira (16 September 1930 – 17 October 2003) was a Portuguese footballer and later manager.

Honours

Player
Benfica
Primeira Divisão: 1949–50

Porto
Primeira Divisão: 1955–56, 1958–59
Taça de Portugal: 1955–56, 1957–58

Individual
Taça de Portugal Top Scorer: 1955–56

Manager
Varzim
Segunda Divisão: 1975–76

References

External links

1930 births
2003 deaths
Portuguese footballers
Primeira Liga players
FC Porto players
S.C. Braga players
S.L. Benfica footballers
Vitória S.C. players
Portugal international footballers
Portuguese football managers
Primeira Liga managers
Boavista F.C. managers
FC Porto managers
Leixões S.C. managers
Académico de Viseu F.C. managers
C.S. Marítimo managers
S.C. Braga managers
F.C. Famalicão managers
Varzim S.C. managers
Association football forwards
Footballers from Lisbon